Law of the Blade is a full-length studio album by German heavy metal band Paragon, released in 2002.

Track listing
 "Abducted" – 03:55
 "Palace of Sin" – 03:55
 "Armies of the Tyrant" – 05:02
 "Law of the Blade" – 03:32
 "Across the Wastelands" – 07:01
 "Shadow World" – 05:33
 "Allied Forces" – 05:28
 "Empire's Fall" – 03:38
 "The Journey's End" – 05:03
 "Back to Glory" – 05:08

Credits 
 Andreas Babuschkin – lead vocals
 Martin Christian – guitars, backing vocals
 Claudius Cremer – guitars
 Jan Bünning – bass, backing vocals
 Markus Corby – drums

All music written and arranged by Paragon.
All lyrics by Babuschkin, except "Palace of Sin" and "Empire's Fall" by Christian.

2002 albums
Paragon (band) albums